The 3rd Moscow International Film Festival was held from 7 to 21 July 1963. The Grand Prix was awarded to the Italian film 8½ directed by Federico Fellini.

Jury
 Grigori Chukhrai (USSR - President of the Jury)
 Shaken Ajmanov (USSR)
 Sergio Amidei (Italy)
 Dušan Vukotić (Yugoslavia)
 Mohamed Kerim (Egypt)
 Stanley Kramer (USA)
 Jean Marais (France)
 Nelson Pereira dos Santos (Brazil)
 Emil Petrov (Bulgaria)
 Jan Procházka (Czechoslovakia)
 Satyajit Ray (India)
 Jan Rybkowski (Poland)
 Kiyohiko Ushihara (Japan)
 János Herskó (Hungary)

Films in competition
The following films were selected for the main competition:

Awards
 Grand Prix: 8½ by Federico Fellini
 Golden Prizes:
 Death Is Called Engelchen by Ján Kadár and Elmar Klos
 Kozara by Veljko Bulajić
 Bad Girl by Kirio Urayama
 Special Silver Prize: Frank Beyer for Naked Among Wolves
 Silver Prizes:
A Trip Without a Load by Vladimir Vengerov
 Tales of a Long Journey by Tamás Rényi
 Black Wings by Ewa Petelska and Czesław Petelski
 Chi tu hau by Pham Ky Nam
 Lupeni 29 by Mircea Drăgan
 Best Actor: Steve McQueen for The Great Escape
 Best Actress: Suchitra Sen for Saat Paake Bandha
 Director of Photography: Jørgen Skov for Den kære familie
 Special Diploma: Pierre Étaix for The Suitor
 Prix FIPRESCI: The Four Days of Naples by Nanni Loy

References

External links
Moscow International Film Festival: 1963 at Internet Movie Database

1963
1963 film festivals
1963 in the Soviet Union
Film